The 1993–94 Idaho Vandals men's basketball team represented the University of Idaho during the 1993–94 NCAA Division I men's basketball season. Members of the Big Sky Conference, the Vandals were led by first-year head coach Joe Cravens and played their home games on campus at the Kibbie Dome in Moscow, Idaho.

At the conference tournament in Boise, the Vandals defeated sixth-seed Montana in the opening round, but lost to league runner-up Idaho State in the semifinals.

Postseason results

|-
!colspan=6 style=| Big Sky tournament

References

External links
Sports Reference – Idaho Vandals: 1993–94 basketball season
Gem of the Mountains: 1994 University of Idaho yearbook – 1993–94 basketball season
Idaho Argonaut – student newspaper – 1994 editions

Idaho Vandals men's basketball seasons
Idaho
Idaho
Idaho